Ingrid Stephanie Boyce (born 1972) is a British solicitor. From March 2021 to October 2022, she was President of the Law Society. website=www.istephanieboyce.com

Life

I. Boyce is of Caribbean descent. Her mother, born on the island of Saint Vincent in Saint Vincent and the Grenadines, came to England aged 15 in 1967 to join her parents, who had emigrated there. I. Boyce's father had come to the UK from Barbados three years earlier. I. Boyce was born in Aylesbury, where she was brought up in a single-parent household on a council estate. The footballer Emmerson Boyce is her younger brother. When she was in her teens, the family relocated to the United States, where she lived for six years before returning to the UK to study law. She gained a law degree from London Guildhall University in 1999, and subsequently passed the Legal Practice Course at the College of Law, Guildford. She was admitted as a solicitor in 2002. She is the director of Stephanie Boyce Consulting Limited (10866503 - incorporated on 14 July 2017), a micro-entity company advising on not-for-profit management and governance.

Law Society
I. Boyce was elected Deputy Vice President of the Law Society in 2019, taking up the post in July 2019. She became the society's vice president in 2020, and its president in March 2021. She was succeeded as president by Lubna Shuja on 12 October 2022.

In May 2021 I. Boyce said that Priti Patel's plans to penalise asylum seekers who arrived in the United Kingdom by "so-called irregular routes" risked a "two-tier asylum system" in breach of international law and the Refugee Convention. After the Queen's Speech at the 2021 State Opening of Parliament announced government plans to limit judicial review in England and Wales, she said that the proposals "would allow unlawful acts by government or public bodies to be untouched or untouchable" and "risk taking power away from citizens".

Membership 
Boyce is a Fellow the Chartered Governance Institute.

In 2022, she received honorary doctorates of law from Keele University and the University of East London, as well as an Alumna of the Year award from King's College London. That year, she also received the High Sheriff of Buckinghamshire for her leadership of the legal profession during the COVID-19 pandemic and for services to equality, diversity and inclusion.

References

1972 births
Living people
People from Aylesbury
Alumni of London Guildhall University
English solicitors
English people of Barbadian descent
English people of Saint Vincent and the Grenadines descent